Collierville Schools  is a municipal school district that serves approximately 9,000 students in Collierville, Tennessee. It was formed by secession from Shelby County Schools in 2014.

History

Collierville Schools was formed in 2014 as one of six suburban school districts to secede from Shelby County Schools after the Tennessee legislature permitted the formation of new school districts the previous year.

The district saw considerable reshuffling due to overcrowding at the start of the 2018–19 school year. The high school received a new amenity-laden $94 million campus, and Schilling Farms Middle School moved into the old high school building as "West Collierville Middle School". The Schilling Farms namesake and old campus were thereafter used for a new elementary school. The following year, the district shifted its middle and high school start times to a later schedule. The shift was prompted by a petition authored by high school student Chase Via that advocated for later school start times.

Upon the creation of the district, former superintendent John Aikten of Shelby County Schools was selected as superintendent. After Aitken retired in 2019, he was succeeded by Dr. Gary Lilly, former superintendent of Bristol Tennessee City Schools.

Schools

High schools 

 Collierville High School

Middle schools 

 Collierville Middle School
 West Collierville Middle School

Elementary schools 

 Bailey Station Elementary School
 Collierville Elementary School
 Crosswind Elementary School
 Sycamore Elementary School
 Tara Oaks Elementary School
 Schilling Farms Elementary School

References

External links
Collierville Schools
 "Schools in Transition." The Commercial Appeal.
 "Collierville Municipal School District Resource Center." Town of Collierville.
School districts in Shelby County, Tennessee
Collierville, Tennessee
School districts established in 2014